Zoey Van Goey were an indie pop band from Glasgow, Scotland, made up of Matt Brennan, Michael John McCarthy, Kim Moore and Adam Scott. Brennan, McCarthy and Moore, hailing from Canada, Ireland and England respectively, formed the initial trio in Glasgow in 2006, with Scott becoming a full-fledged member in 2010. The band stopped performing in 2012. 

The band's debut single, "Foxtrot Vandals," was produced by the Belle and Sebastian frontman Stuart Murdoch, and released on seven-inch vinyl in 2007. They released another single, "Sweethearts in Disguise," on seven-inch vinyl in 2008 which was produced by Paul Savage of The Delgados. 

Their debut album, The Cage Was Unlocked All Along, also produced by Savage, was first self-released in 2009 and then re-released by Chemikal Underground Records. Their second album, Propeller Versus Wings, was released in 2011.

Press coverage
Zoey Van Goey were received onto the Scottish music scene being described as "like the Postal Service with a sense of humour," being included in national press alongside established acts such as The Chemical Brothers.

Tours and gigs
In 2007, Glasgow-based writer Alan Bissett approached the band and Y'all is Fantasy Island suggesting they perform together. In May 2007, all three performed together in a short tour of Central Scotland. The three acts, dubbed as The Super Puny Humans also performed as a collective during the concerts. 

In 2008, Zoey Van Goey played the unsigned stages of Scotland's biggest music festivals, including T in the Park, Connect Music Festival, Wickerman Festival, Live at Loch Lomond and Rock Ness.

In December 2010, Zoey Van Goey played at Bowlie 2, the All Tomorrow's Parties Festival curated by Belle and Sebastian. In  2011, Zoey Van Goey launched their new album Propeller Versus Wings and supported Belle & Sebastian on their European tour.

Discography

Singles & EPs
"Foxtrot Vandals" (2007)
"Song To The Embers" (Miaoux Miaoux remix)
"Sweethearts In Disguise" (vinyl single) (2008)
"Sweethearts In Disguise"
"Lick A 99" (Funkspiel Remix)
"Lick A 99" (Chris 'Beans' Geddes Remix) (found on a bonus CD inserted with the vinyls sold at gigs)

Albums
The Cage Was Unlocked All Along (2009)
"The Best Treasure Stays Buried"
"We Don't Have That Kind Of Bread"
"Sweethearts In Disguise"
"We All Hid In Basements"
"Two White Ghosts"
"Foxtrot Vandals"
"My Persecution Complex"
"Nae Wonder"
"Cotton Covering"
"City Is Exploding"

Propeller Versus Wings (2011)
"Mountain On Fire"
"The Cake And Eating It"
"Sackville Sun"
"My Aviator"
"Escape Maps"
"You Told The Drunks I Knew Karate"
"Little Islands"
"Extremities"
"Robot Tyrannosaur"
"Another Day Another Disaster"
"Where It Lands"

Contributions
 "Xmas in New York" Avalanche Records Alternative Christmas 2009

Other recordings
"Song To The Embers"
"Tell Me Lies"
"Jump Your Bones"

References

British indie rock groups
Chemikal Underground artists